The 2019 ICF Canoe Slalom World Championships were the 40th edition of the ICF Canoe Slalom World Championships. The event took place from 24 to 29 September 2019 in La Seu d'Urgell, Spain under the auspices of International Canoe Federation (ICF). The events took place at the Segre Olympic Park which also hosted the canoe slalom events at the 1992 Summer Olympics. La Seu d'Urgell hosted the championships for the third time after previously hosting the event in 1999 and 2009.

As is traditional in a pre-Olympic year, the Championships also doubled as the primary qualification event for the 2020 Summer Olympics. The top placed boats (subject to a limit of one per nation) earned their NOCs a qualification quota. 18 qualification spots were available in the K1 events, and eleven in the C1.

Seu also hosted the Wildwater Canoeing World Championships as part of the same event.

Schedule
Nine medal events were contested.

All times listed are UTC+2.

Medal summary

Medal table

Men

Canoe

Kayak

Women

Canoe

Kayak

Mixed

Canoe

Olympic qualification

The 2019 World Championships also served as a main qualification event in each of the individual boat classes. The following nations each qualified a boat in the stated event:

Great Britain, the Czech Republic and Spain achieved qualification in all four classes, and thus joined host Japan in completing their qualification pathway for Canoe slalom at the 2020 Games. Further events providing opportunities to qualify for other nations will take place throughout 2020.

References

External links
ICF website

ICF Canoe Slalom World Championships
World Canoe Slalom Championships
ICF Canoe Slalom World Championships
ICF Canoe Slalom World Championships
International sports competitions hosted by Spain